Ekaterina Andreevna Kazionova (born 13 January 1999) is a Russian tennis player.

Kazionova has career-high WTA rankings of 280 in singles and 310 in doubles. Up to date, she has won two singles and nine doubles titles at tournaments of the ITF Circuit.

Kazionova made her WTA Tour main-draw debut at the 2022 Morocco Open, after having received a wildcard entry into the doubles tournament, partnering with Yasmine Kabbaj.

ITF Circuit finals

Singles: 10 (2 titles, 8 runner-ups)

Doubles: 23 (9 titles, 14 runner-ups)

References

External links
 
 

1991 births
Living people
Russian female tennis players
20th-century Russian women
21st-century Russian women